Russell v Transocean International Resources Ltd [2011] UKSC 57 is a UK labour law case, concerning the interpretation of the Working Time Directive. It is notable that Lord Hope remarked that the right to paid holidays is probably best interpreted as requiring that workers may take a whole week at a time, rather than individual days.

Facts
Workers on an offshore oil and gas rig claimed paid annual leave for the time they were offshore under the Working Time Directive 2003/88/EC article 7, and the Working Time Regulations 1998 regulation 13. This would effectively double their holiday pay because most of them had shifts where they worked two weeks off shore and two weeks on shore as the ‘field break’, when they were mostly free from work related obligations, but had to do training, medical assessments, and so on. When offshore they did 12-hour shifts every day. The employers argued that they were not entitled, because the field breaks counted as leave, not working.

The parties appealed from the Aberdeen Employment Tribunal and Court of Session to the House of Lords.

Judgment
Lord Hope held that it was plain that the workers were not working when they came back onshore, and this was so obvious as to not require a reference to the ECJ. He noted that the requirement for ‘four weeks’ seemed to mean four week long periods, uninterrupted, but the weeks themselves could be separated. He said the following.

Lord Brown, Lord Mance, Lord Kerr, and Lord Wilson concurred.

See also

EU competition law

References

Supreme Court of the United Kingdom cases
2011 in British law
2011 in case law